Portillo may refer to:

Portillo (surname), including a list of people with the surname
Portillo de Toledo, Spain
Portillo, Valladolid, Spain
Portillo, Chile
Portillo's Restaurants
Portillo, Adjuntas, Puerto Rico, a barrio of Adjuntas, Puerto Rico